Huis te Ruurlo is a Dutch castle in Ruurlo, Gelderland, the Netherlands.

Huis te Ruurlo was mentioned in 1326 and has been in the hands of the Dutch noble Van Heeckeren family since the 15th century.

References

See also
List of castles in the Netherlands

Castles in Gelderland
Rijksmonuments in Gelderland
Berkelland
Water castles